The Malto or Maler people, also known as Pahariya, are a Dravidian tribal group from the Rajmahal Hills in the northeastern Chota Nagpur Plateau. They are divided into three subgroups: Mal Paharia, Sauria Paharia and Kumarbhag Paharia. All three are listed as Scheduled Tribes in Jharkhand, Bihar and West Bengal. They speak Malto, related to the nearby Kurukh language.

When the British first encountered them they were nomadic. They practiced jhum cultivation, as well as hunting and gathering, and would often also raid the plains of Bihar to the north or Bengal to the east, and would then retreat back into the forest. If there was a crop failure, death or other disaster, they would move to a new spot. Due to the remoteness of their territory they were never conquered by any of the many empires that claimed to rule the region. When the British induced Santals to cultivate the Rajmahal Hills, the Maltos fought back, but were eventually driven out.

The three subgroups of the Malto tribe do not intermarry. The Mal Paharia look down on the Sauria Paharia for eating cows.

The Mal Paharia and Kumarbhag Paharia subgroups combined have a population of 182,560, while the Sauria Paharia subgroup has a population of 51,634, making the total Malto population 234,194.

Today they still practice jhum cultivation, called kurwa in their language, and collect minor forest produce. They are plagued by many problems, including high levels of poverty and extreme malnutrition. For this reason they are classified as a Particularly Vulnerable Tribal Group. However some are now settled cultivators. They fish in summer, and many now work as daily wage labourers. A few have government jobs.

Among the Sauria Paharia, their traditional marriage ceremony is known as bedi, that takes place in a house. Their society has no restrictions on premarital sexual relations, and children not born out of a marriage can still live with the mother. Another type of common marriage is marriage by capture.

The Malto practice animism and revere a court of spirits known as Gosain. The main Malto god is Dharmer Gosain, a sun god, while their priests are known as demano.

The men wear a small loincloth, known as bhagwan, while the women wear two garments: panchi, an upper garment, usually an unstitched cloth, and pardhan, a cloth around the waist.

References

Dravidian peoples
Ethnic groups in Bangladesh
Ethnic groups in India
Adivasi